Izayana Adelina Marenco Vivas (born 9 October 1992) is a Nicaraguan international level judoka.

In 2021, she competed in the women's +78 kg event at the 2020 Summer Olympics in Tokyo, Japan.

She participated at the 2019 Pan American Judo Championships, and 2021 Pan American Judo Championships.

References

External links 

 Izayana Marenco, Selección Nacional de Judo Rumbo a Tokio Jul 10, 2021
 

Nicaraguan female judoka
Living people
1992 births
Judoka at the 2019 Pan American Games
Pan American Games competitors for Nicaragua
Judoka at the 2020 Summer Olympics
Olympic judoka of Nicaragua